Elizabeth de Burgh, Duchess of Clarence, suo jure 4th Countess of Ulster and 5th Baroness of Connaught (6 July 1332 – 10 December 1363) was a Norman-Irish noblewoman who married Lionel of Antwerp, 1st Duke of Clarence.

Family 
Elizabeth was born at Carrickfergus Castle near Belfast, Ireland, the only child of William Donn de Burgh, 3rd Earl of Ulster, and Maud of Lancaster, Countess of Ulster. She was the last of the senior legitimate line of the descendants of William de Burgh. Her paternal grandparents were John de Burgh and Elizabeth de Clare, and her maternal grandparents were Henry, 3rd Earl of Lancaster and Maud Chaworth. Her younger half-sister was Maud de Ufford, through her mother's second marriage to Sir Ralph de Ufford, Justiciar of Ireland.

Marriage 
Upon William's murder on 6 June 1333, she became the sole legal heir to all the de Burgh lands in Ireland. Actually, her kinsmen Sir Edmond de Burgh of Clanwilliam, Sir Edmond Albanach Bourke the Mac William Iochtar, Sir Ulick Burke the Mac William Uachtar became the de facto heads of the family and owners of de Burgh land during the Burke Civil War.  This is because she was merely 11 months old at the time.

As Countess of Ulster, she was raised in England and married Lionel of Antwerp, 1st Duke of Clarence, on 15 August 1352 at the Tower of London. He was the second son of Edward III of England and his queen consort, Philippa of Hainault. As a boy, the poet Geoffrey Chaucer served as page to Elizabeth.

The couple had one child, Philippa, born on 16 August 1355, the eldest grandchild of Edward III and Queen Philippa. Elizabeth's daughter Philippa succeeded as Countess of Ulster, and married Edmund Mortimer, 3rd Earl of March, in 1368. Both their titles passed to their son Roger Mortimer, and eventually through their granddaughter Anne de Mortimer, who married into the House of York. The House of York would base its claim to the English throne on their descent from Lionel of Antwerp.

Elizabeth died in Dublin in 1363 during her husband's term as Governor of Ireland. She was buried at Bruisyard Abbey, Suffolk; as her body was being repatriated, her husband obtained royal approval for her mother's new foundation of Franciscan nuns there.

Ancestry

References

Works cited
 

1332 births
1363 deaths
People from County Galway
Burgh
Hereditary women peers
Clarence
14th-century English people
14th-century Irish people
Elizabeth
Burials at Clare Priory
14th-century Irish women
14th-century English women